

Libra (Latin for "scales") is the seventh astrological sign in the zodiac. It spans 180°–210° celestial longitude. The Sun transits this sign on average between September 22 and October 23. The symbol of the scales is based on the Scales of Justice held by Themis, the Greek personification of divine law and custom. She became the inspiration for modern depictions of Lady Justice. The ruling planet of Libra is Venus. Libra is the only zodiac sign that is represented by an object; with the other eleven signs represented by either an animal or mythological character.

Astrological associations
Libra is the cardinal modality of the three air signs, the others being Gemini and Aquarius. The main connotations of planets under this sign are sociable, rational, and detached when dealing with situations. Libra is symbolized by the scales and is associated with the Roman deity Iustitia. According to the writer Manilius, Roman judges are born under the sign of Libra.

The Moon was said to be in Libra when Rome was founded and this was based on the historical passage, which state "qua condita Roma". Everything was balanced under this righteous sign. Manilius once said that Libra was the sign "in which the seasons are balanced". Both the hours of the day and the hours of the night match each other. Thus why the Romans put so much trust in the "balanced sign".
Going back to ancient Greek times, Libra the constellation between Virgo and Scorpio used to be ruled over by the constellation of Scorpio. They called the area the Latin word "chelae", which translated to "the claws" which can help identify the individual stars that make up the full constellation of Libra, since it was so closely identified with the Scorpion constellation in the sky.

Gallery

See also

Astronomical symbols
Chinese zodiac
Circle of stars
Cusp (astrology)
Elements of the zodiac
History of astrology

Notes

Works cited
 Longitude of Sun, apparent geocentric ecliptic of date, interpolated to find time of crossing 0°, 30°....

External links

 Warburg Institute Iconographic Database (over 300 medieval and early modern images of Libra) 

Western astrological signs